The Battle of Bajarwan was a battle that took place during the Second Arab–Khazar War, between the armies of the Khazar Khaganate, led by the khagan's son Barjik, and the Umayyad Caliphate, whose commanding general was Sa'id ibn Amr al-Harashi. 

After the disastrous defeat at the Battle of Marj Ardebil, the Khazars roamed freely across the lands of Azarbaijan, Kurdistan, and Armenia. With little forces immediately available, Caliph Hisham appointed Sa'id ibn Amr al-Harashi to take command against the Khazars, and assemble whatever forces he could at Raqqa. Gathering a small army (including refugees from Ardabil who had to be paid ten gold dinars to be persuaded to fight), Sa'id managed to recover Akhlat on Lake Van. From there he moved north to Bardha'a, and south again to relieve the Khazar siege of Warthan. The besiegers withdrew to Bajarwan, and a battle was fought some 24 km from the town. Sa'id scored a crushing victory, killing most of the 10,000 Khazars, and rescuing the prisoners they had with them, reportedly 5,000 families. The Arabs also captured the Khazar general's flag, which became the battle standard of his tribe, the Harish. Some sources report that Barjik too was slain and that Sa'id sent his head to the Caliph, but al-Tabari and others report his death only later, during Maslamah ibn Abd al-Malik's 731 invasion north of the Caucasus. After this, the Khazar armies fled north, abandoning their conquests in Azerbaijan and Arran, with Sa'id in pursuit.

References
 
 
 

Bajarwan
Bajarwan
Bajarwan
Bajarwan
730
730s in the Umayyad Caliphate